Buggin is a surname. Notable people with the surname include:

Lady Cecilia Buggin (–1873), second wife of Prince Augustus Frederick, sixth son of King George III
Christopher Buggin (1572–1603), English politician
Edward Buggin (died 1590), English politician

See also
Critters Buggin, American instrumental music group
Buggin', song from American film Space Jam
Bugging, use of a covert listening device